Horton is an unincorporated community in Marshall County, Alabama, United States. Its ZIP code is 35980. As of the 2000 census, the population was approximately 4,450. The median household income was $27,536, and the per capita income was $13,342. The median value of a single-family home was $72,200.

Horton is also the home to the Silver Ridge Golf Course

References

Unincorporated communities in Marshall County, Alabama
Unincorporated communities in Alabama